Camp Verde (Western Apache: Gambúdih) is a town in Yavapai County, Arizona, United States. As of the 2010 census, the population of the town is 10,873.

Every summer, the downtown area of Camp Verde is the site of the annual Corn Fest; held each year on the third Saturday in July, the popular event is sponsored and organized by local growers, Hauser and Hauser Farms. Other annual local events include the Pecan, Wine and Antiques Festival (February), the Crawdad Festival (June), and Fort Verde Days (October).

Geography
Highway 260 connects Camp Verde with Payson to the east and Cottonwood to the west. Three freeway exits provide local access: Exits 285, 287, and 289. Camp Verde is located at  (34.5667, -111.8562).

Camp Verde is in the Verde River valley. To the southwest lie the Black Hills mountain range. Camp Verde is surrounded by Prescott National Forest. The Mogollon Rim is just north of the town and forms the southwestern edge of the large, geologically ancient Colorado Plateau.

Climate
Camp Verde has a cold semi-arid climate (Köppen: BSk) with cool winters and very hot summers.

Demographics

Camp Verde's population was 285 in the 1960 census. By the 1980s, the population had grown to 3,824.

As of the census of 2000, there were 9,451 people, 2,611 households, and 2,538 families residing in the town. The racial makeup of the town was 85.1% White, 0.4% Black or African American, 7.3% Native American, 0.2% Asian, 0.1% Pacific Islander, 4.7% from other races, and 2.2% from two or more races. 10.9% of the population were Hispanic or Latino of any race.

There were 2,611 households, out of which 27.4% had children under the age of 18 living with them, 55.9% were married couples living together, 9.8% had a female householder with no husband present, and 29.7% were non-families. 24.3% of all households were made up of individuals, and 11.8% had someone living alone who was 65 years of age or older. The average household size was 2.52 and the average family size was 2.97.

In the town, the population was spread out, with 24.0% under the age of 18, 7.2% from 18 to 24, 23.0% from 25 to 44, 25.3% from 45 to 64, and 20.5% who were 65 years of age or older. The median age was 42 years. For every 100 females, there were 101.5 males. For every 100 females age 18 and over, there were 100.2 males.

The median income for a household in the town was $31,868, and the median income for a family was $37,049. Males had a median income of $30,104 versus $20,306 for females. The per capita income for the town was $15,072. About 9.5% of families and 14.0% of the population were below the poverty line, including 21.2% of those under age 18 and 6.1% of those age 65 or over.

Tourism
Tourist attractions include the nearby Montezuma Castle National Monument located in Verde Valley. In the town is Fort Verde State Historic Park, and Out of Africa Wildlife Park. The Cliff Castle Casino, operated by the Yavapai-Apache Nation Indian tribe, is an important gambling destination for north and central Arizona.

Education
Camp Verde Unified School District serves the community.

Transportation
Greyhound Lines serves Camp Verde on its Phoenix–Las Vegas and Los Angeles–New York routes. Groome Transportation serves Camp Verde on its Phoenix–Sedona and Phoenix-Flagstaff routes.

Camp Verde is located at the junction of Interstate 17 and Arizona State Route 260.

In popular culture
The Marvel Comics superhero characters James and John Proudstar are from a reservation in Camp Verde.

The 1977 horror movie Kingdom of the Spiders was filmed in Camp Verde.

In the 2011 film Paul, Simon Pegg and Nick Frost plan to visit Camp Verde as a UFO hot spot along with Rachel, Nevada, Area 51, Apache Junction, Arizona and Roswell, New Mexico.

In Cable #7, Camp Verde is a bunker headquarters of the X-Force.

Historic places

References

External links
 Camp Verde Official website
 
 The Camp Verde Bugle – Local newspaper
 The Camp Verde Journal – Local newspaper
 

Towns in Yavapai County, Arizona
Historic American Buildings Survey in Arizona
Populated places established in 1986